Kuvandyksky (masculine), Kuvandykskaya (feminine), or Kuvandykskoye (neuter) may refer to:
Kuvandyksky District, a district of Orenburg Oblast, Russia
Kuvandyksky Urban Okrug, a municipal formation in Orenburg Oblast, Russia